Chorin is a railway station in the village of Chorin, Brandenburg, Germany. The station lies of the Berlin–Szczecin railway and the train services are operated by Deutsche Bahn.

Train services
The station is served by the following service(s):

Regional services  Stralsund - Greifswald - Pasewalk - Angermünde - Berlin - Ludwigsfelde - Jüterbog - Falkenberg - Elsterwerda
Regional services  Schwedt - Angermünde - Berlin - Ludwigsfelde - Jüterbog - Lutherstadt Wittenberg

References

Railway stations in Brandenburg
Buildings and structures in Barnim
Railway stations in Germany opened in 1902